Lee Eun-sang may refer to:
 Lee Eun-sang (poet)
 Lee Eun-sang (singer)